Marie-Madeleine Jarret, known as Madeleine de Verchères ((); 3 March 1678 – 8 August 1747) was a woman of New France (modern Quebec) credited with repelling a raid on Fort Verchères when she was 14 years old.

Early life
Madeleine's father, François Jarret, of Saint-Chef (in the department of Isère in France), joined the company of his uncle Antoine Pécaudy de Contrecœur to battle the Iroquois in New France (see Beaver Wars). They arrived there in August 1665, and on 17 September 1669, Jarret married the twelve-year-old Marie Perrot in Île d’Orléans. He was awarded a land grant on the south shore of the Saint Lawrence River on 29 October 1672 in a seigneury called Verchères, and thereafter continued to increase his landholdings. The couple was to have twelve children, the fourth of whom was Madeleine de Verchères, born in Verchères on 3 March 1678 and baptized on 17 April.

The seigneury underwent periodic Iroquois raids. In 1690 the matron of Verchères took command of a successful defense against an Iroquois assault on the stockade there. By 1692 the Iroquois had killed the Jarrets' son François-Michel and two successive husbands of their daughter Marie-Jeanne. Before she performed this courageous act, she usually worked in the family field during her spare time.

Thwarting a surprise attack
In the late 1600s, the Iroquois mounted attacks on the settlers of New France, looting and burning their homes. On 22 October 1692 Madeleine's parents left the fort on business and to gather winter supplies. Madeleine and her brothers and sisters stayed at the fort. Now fourteen, Madeleine was in charge of the fort, with one very old man (Laviolette) and two soldiers.

One morning, some settlers left the fort to tend to the fields along with eight soldiers. Madeleine was in the cabbage garden, quite close to the fort. Suddenly, the Iroquois descended on the settlers. The men, caught off guard, tried to flee to safety. However, the Iroquois were too quick for them and they were easily caught and carried off. Madeleine, working only 200 paces from the fort, had a head start on the Iroquois who were chasing her. One Iroquois caught up to her and grabbed her by her kerchief which she quickly untied, then Madeleine ran into the fort shouting, "Aux armes! Aux armes!" (To arms)

Madeleine ran to the bastions. She knew there was only one hope. Madeleine fired a musket and encouraged the people to make as much noise as possible so that the Iroquois would think there were many soldiers defending the fort. Then Madeleine fired the cannon to warn other forts of an attack and to call for reinforcements. The Iroquois had hoped a surprise attack would easily take over the fort, so for a moment, they retreated into the bushes with their prisoners.

During the siege, Madeleine noticed a canoe approaching the landing site with a family named Fontaine. The soldiers inside the fort refused to leave, so Madeleine ran to the dock and led the family quickly inside, pretending to be reinforcements.

Late in the evening, the settlers' cattle returned to the fort. She knew that the Iroquois could be hiding with the herd covered in animal skins. She had her two brothers wait with her to check the cattle for warriors but none were found and the cows were brought inside the fort.

Reinforcements from Montreal arrived just after the Iroquois left. Tired but relieved, Madeleine greeted the French lieutenant, "Mon seigneur, I surrender to you my arms." The reinforcements caught the Iroquois and returned the kidnapped settlers. By this time, Madeleine's parents had returned and news of Madeleine's heroic deed had spread through the colony.

Later life
François, Madeleine's father, died on 16 February 1700, and his pension of 1000 livres was transferred to Madeleine due to her leadership in 1692, on the condition that she provide for her mother.

Madeleine managed Verchères until her marriage in September 1706 to Pierre-Thomas Tarieu de La Pérade, who was a lieutenant in the regular troops of New France. He was the son of Thomas de Lanouguère, an administrator of the colony who descended from an old noble family in France. The couple moved to Sainte-Anne-de-la-Pérade, Quebec, where Tarieu was co-seigneur. Madeleine's seigneury at Verchères was transferred to her new husband. The complex land titles led to numerous lawsuits over the course of her life, and Madeleine sailed to France at least three times to represent herself and her husband in court.

Marie-Madeleine died at Sainte-Anne-de-la-Pérade on 8 August 1747 at age 69. She was buried beneath her pew at Sainte-Anne-de-la-Pérade. Pierre-Thomas died 26 January 1757 at age 79.

Historiography and legacy
The earliest reports of the raid of 1692 did not mention Madeleine. Five accounts of the siege of 1692 appeared during Madeleine's lifetime. The earliest is a letter Madeleine wrote to the Comtesse de Maurepas 15 October 1699, in which she gives her story in a petition for a pension. She wrote a longer, greatly embellished version dated 1722 or later to Governor Beauharnois at his request. Claude-Charles de La Potherie in 1722 published two accounts: the first is virtually the same as Madeleine's letter of 1699, and the second virtually the same as the later to Beauharnois; both may have been based on, or were even the basis of, Madeleine's own. Pierre François Xavier de Charlevoix published another embellished version in 1744. In 1730 Gervais Levebre, a priest against whom Madeleine had initiated a legal process, was recorded stating, "God fears neither hero nor heroine", which suggests her story was well known by that time.

Accounts progressively emphasized Madeleine's disguising herself as a man, the necessity of which is questioned: her mother had commanded a similar defense two years earlier with no such disguise. In her first account, Madeleine describes how she escaped from an Iroquois by leaving her scarf in his hands and then replacing her headdress with a soldier's helmet. Charlevoix adds to this that she knotted up her hair and put on a man's jerkin. Later accounts may represent later societies' anxieties over Madeleine's transvestism. The 1730 lawsuit was over the priest Levebre's calling Madeleine a "whore", which may suggest notions of free sexuality the public had of women who assumed such a traditionally male role as that of a warrior.

Many writers took pains to ensure that, after the siege, Madeleine returned fully to her traditional feminine role and demeanor. In 1912, a journalist wrote that she "was a perfect woman, as good a housekeeper as a mother". The curate Frédéric-Alexandre Baillairgé wrote that though "strong,  was nonetheless soft and sensitive". Some were more explicit, as Lionel Groulx who wrote that women "must sometimes fill in for men, but they must render them the arms for the battles that are more appropriate for them". While female writers also often emphasized Madeleine's return to a traditional role supporting the men, others used her story to advance a feminist position of the role of women in Canadian history.

Comparisons have been drawn between Madeleine and Joan of Arc—both teenaged virgins who dressed as males—and to Jeanne Hachette, who led the defense of Beauvais. Parallels have also been seen with Madeleine's contemporary Adam Dollard des Ormeaux, the hero of the Battle of Long Sault during the Beaver Wars.

Verchères's story was mostly forgotten following her death. It was revived after the discovery of her in the 1860s, and from the 1880s to the 1920s she achieved the status of a symbol of French-Canadian nationalism. In the wake of the Conscription Crisis of 1917, Marie-Victorin Kirouac wrote a play, Peuple sans histoire ("A people without history", 1918). In it an indignant young French-Canadian servant to Lord Durham, upon reading a report of Durham's following the Lower Canada Rebellion of 1837 in which he declares the French Canadians have no history, appends to it "Thou liest, Durham!" and signs it Madeleine de Verchères. The story he hears from her of Verchères convinces him to give credence to the French Canadians and compares the story to "a canto of the Iliad".

Later authors used the story of Madeleine for nationalistic ends. To rally support for the Imperial Order Daughters of the Empire, Arthur Doughty's account of 1916 makes parallels between the Germans in World War I and the Iroquois who stood in the way of "the advance of European civilization".

While heroes such as Dollard had had monuments erected to their memories, by the early 20th century that there was no such monument to Madeleine de Verchères came to public notice. Baillairgé raised funds for such a monument to commemorate Verchères and its heroine, and by July 1912 had raised $2000. Other efforts led to the federal government donating $25,000, and the wife of the mayor of Verchères unveiled the statue in a ceremony on 20 September 1913. Among the speeches delivered, the prime minister Wilfrid Laurier declared, "If the kingdom of France was delivered and regenerated by Joan of Arc, this colony, then French in its cradle, was illustrated by Madeleine de Verchères".

The stories of Madeleine de Verchères and Laura Secord in Upper Canada have served as nationalist stories for French and English Canadians. Both were heroines in early Canadian settlements defending themselves from enemy forces—though where the enemy was the Iroquois to Madeleine, in Secord's story they were allies who helped her escape the Americans to inform the British of a pending attack. The motivations of the Iroquois are not made clear in contemporary documents.

In modern culture
A statue of Madeleine de Verchères stands on Verchères Point near Montreal. It was made by Louis-Philippe Hébert, who was commissioned for the project in 1911.

Madeleine de Verchères, a J.-Arthur Homier film released 10 December 1922, featured Estelle Bélanger as Madeleine. The Internet Movie Database reports this film as "lost."

The Canadian government designated her as a Person of National Historic Significance in 1923.

Madeleine Takes Command (1946) by Ethel C. Brill is a historical novel based upon the siege of Verchères.

References

Works cited

 
 
 
 
Wallace, W. Stewart, ed. The Encyclopedia of Canada, Vol. VI  Toronto, University Associates of Canada, 1948. Online

Further reading

People of New France
French Quebecers
Canadian children
1678 births
1747 deaths
Persons of National Historic Significance (Canada)
18th-century Canadian women
Women in war